Ralph Krueger (born 31 August 1959) is a Canadian-born German professional ice hockey coach and former player. He is the former head coach of the Edmonton Oilers and Buffalo Sabres of the National Hockey League (NHL), and former chairman of Southampton Football Club. Since April 2019, he has held a Swiss passport.

He was head coach of the Swiss men's national ice hockey team from the 1997–98 season until the end of the XXI Olympic Winter Games in 2010 and the Edmonton Oilers of the National Hockey League (NHL) during the 2012–13 season. In 2014, Krueger shifted from hockey to the world of association football, to become director of English Premier League team Southampton. On 12 March 2014, Krueger was appointed the chairman of Southampton F.C. In April 2019, Krueger left the club to return to hockey full time.

He is also known for his involvement in the World Economic Forum, where since 2011 he has been a Member, Global Agenda Council on New Models of Leadership.

Playing career
Krueger came to Germany in the late 1970s, joining second-division side Duisburger SC. After one year, he returned to Canada, but was back in Germany in 1980 and would stay there for the remainder of his playing days. He saw action in 350 games of the German Bundesliga, accumulating 187 goals and 186 assists. In the 1980–81 season, as a member of Düsseldorfer EG, he led the league in scoring during the playoffs, with 22 points. He also played 45 games for the West German national ice hockey team.

Coaching career
Krueger began his coaching career as an assistant with EV Duisburg of the German second league. Between 1994 and 1998, he led VEU Feldkirch to five straight Austrian championships, culminating in Feldkirch becoming champions in 1998 of the European Hockey League, made up of the champions of various European leagues. This experience later encouraged him to author a motivational book. After the successes with the Austrian team, he took over as full-time head coach of the Swiss national ice hockey team, having split his time between Feldkirch and Switzerland in 1998. His tenure with the Swiss national team has also seen some notable successes. He led the team to appearances at the 2002, 2006 and 2010 Olympic Games and to several World Championship appearances. Krueger was also a scouting consultant for the Carolina Hurricanes.

Krueger spoke at the World Hockey Summit in 2010, and addressed the need to co-ordinate International Ice Hockey Federation and National Hockey League events. He suggested that the World Cup of Hockey be played every four years, alternating with the Olympic Games every two years. He wanted to see the Ice Hockey World Championships became an under-23 event during Olympic years. He felt it would be beneficial to national teams to evaluate their younger talent at the international level. He wanted to resurrect the Champions Hockey League and Victoria Cup competitions, which he felt would make the game more popular in Europe.

Krueger joined the Oilers as associate coach in 2010. Although during his time with the Swiss team, Krueger may have been known as a defensive-minded coach, he has also demonstrated the ability to deliver the offensive style of game. This was confirmed by his performance as coach for VEU Feldkirch in Austria. He has been described as a great communicator, positive thinker and a motivator. The book he authored (in German, also translated into French), called Teamlife - Beyond Setbacks to Success, was devoted to handling problems in life, and became a bestseller.

The Oilers promoted Krueger to head coach for the 2012–13 NHL season, but he was relieved of his duties after only one season. Hockey Canada subsequently added Krueger as a special adviser to its coaching staff for the 2014 Winter Olympics.

Krueger was chosen to coach Team Europe in the 2016 World Cup of Hockey.

On 15 May 2019, Krueger returned to the NHL as the head coach of the Buffalo Sabres. The Sabres fired Krueger on 17 March 2021. At the time, the Sabres were on a 12-game winless streak and held the worst record in the league.

Soccer
In 2014, Krueger made the switch from ice hockey to soccer, becoming director of Southampton in February 2014. Shortly after, he was appointed chairman of the club. He was dismissed on April 12, 2019; set to leave on June 30 when his contract expired.

Personal life
Born in Winnipeg, Krueger was raised in Steinbach, Manitoba. His parents were immigrants from Germany. He attended St. John's-Ravenscourt School where he played hockey as a centre. His son Justin was a member of the Charlotte Checkers of the American Hockey League and now plays for SC Bern. Justin played for Germany's men's national ice hockey team at the 2017 IIHF World Championship.

In April 2019, Krueger, his wife and daughter received Swiss citizenship.

On 4 February 2021, Krueger tested positive for COVID-19.

Career statistics

Regular season and playoffs

International

Head coaching record

NHL

Bibliography
 Ralph Krueger: Teamlife - Über Niederlagen zum Erfolg [German]; Werd Verlag, Zürich 2001;

References

External links
 

1959 births
Living people
Buffalo Sabres coaches
Calgary Wranglers (WHL) players
Canadian expatriate ice hockey players in Germany
Canadian ice hockey coaches
Canadian ice hockey right wingers
Canadian people of German descent
Carolina Hurricanes scouts
Düsseldorfer EG players
Edmonton Oilers coaches
German ice hockey coaches
German ice hockey players
New Westminster Bruins players
People from Steinbach, Manitoba
SC Riessersee players
Schwenninger Wild Wings players
Southampton F.C. directors and chairmen
Sportspeople from Steinbach, Manitoba
Ice hockey people from Winnipeg
Starbulls Rosenheim players